Schenkelberg is an Ortsgemeinde – a community belonging to a Verbandsgemeinde – in the Westerwaldkreis in Rhineland-Palatinate, Germany.

Geography

Schenkelberg lies 3 km from Herschbach and 7 km from Selters. Right nearby is found the Westerwald Lake Plateau, a popular holiday and recreation area. The local area offers many hiking and cycling paths. The community belongs to the Verbandsgemeinde of Selters, a kind of collective municipality. Its seat is in the like-named town.

History
In 1219, Schenkelberg had its first documentary mention, and after several slight spelling changes has borne the same name since 1624 that it still bears today.

Politics

The municipal council is made up of 12 council members, as well as the honorary and presiding mayor (Ortsbürgermeister), who were elected in a municipal election on 13 June 2004.

Sitzverteilung im gewählten Gemeinderat:

Economy and infrastructure

The community lies west of Bundesstraße 8, leading from Limburg an der Lahn to Siegburg. The nearest Autobahn interchange is Mogendorf on the A 3 (Cologne–Frankfurt). The nearest InterCityExpress stop is the railway station at Montabaur on the Cologne-Frankfurt high-speed rail line.

References

External links
Schenkelberg 
Schenkelberg 
Verbandsgemeinde of Selters 

Municipalities in Rhineland-Palatinate
Westerwaldkreis